Affluence, formerly Ho King, is an at-grade MTR Light Rail stop located between Affluence Garden and Tuen Mun River in Tuen Mun District. It began service on 18 September 1988 and belongs to Zone 2.

References

MTR Light Rail stops
Former Kowloon–Canton Railway stations
Tuen Mun
Railway stations in Hong Kong opened in 1988
MTR Light Rail stops named from housing estates